Diamond Food-Fine Chef Sport Club is a female professional volleyball team based in Saraburi, Thailand. The club was founded in 2019 and plays in the Thailand league.

Honours

Domestic competitions 

 Women's Volleyball Thailand League 
 Champion : 2020–21
 Women's Volleyball Pro Challenge 
 Champion : 2019

Former names 

 Diamond Food Volleyball Club (2019–2021)
 Diamond Food-Fine Chef Sport Club (2021–Present)

Team colors 
Pro Challenge

    (2019)

Thailand League

    (2019–present)

League results

Team roster 2021–22

Team staff 
As of September 2020

Sponsors 

 Diamond Food
 Fine Chef
 Grand Sport
 Rock Tape
 Hi Power Shot
 Big Gym Bangkok
 Air force

2021-22 Results and fixtures

Thailand League

First leg

Second Leg

Head coach

Team Captains

Imports

Notable players 

Domestic Players

 Napat Muekkhuntod
 Pannapa Chanphuk
 Sasitorn Pimpa
 Alisa Sengsane
 Jureerat Saeaung
 Suwaphitch Suwannasing
 Chatsuda Nilapa
 Anisa Yotpinit
 Duenpen Areelue
 Onuma Sittirak
 Jarasporn Bundasak
 Hattaya Bamrungsuk
 Nootsara Tomkom
 Malika Kanthong
 Kaewkalaya Kamulthala

Foreigner Players

 Tiana Dockery

 Zheng Yixin
 Du Qing Qing

 Fernanda Tomé

 Liannes Castañeda Simon

 Carla Rueda Cotito

References

External links 
 

Volleyball clubs in Thailand
Women's volleyball teams
Volleyball clubs established in 2019
2019 establishments in Thailand